Intelligence is the ability to perceive or infer information, and to retain it.

Intelligence may also refer to:

Information
 Business intelligence, for business analysis purposes
 Military intelligence, a military discipline using information collection and analysis 
 Strategic intelligence, at the national and international level
 Police intelligence, an element of the British police

Arts, entertainment and media

Music
 "Intelligence", a song by ...And You Will Know Us by the Trail of Dead from the 2003 EP The Secret of Elena's Tomb 
 The Intelligence, an American rock band

Literature
  Intelligence (journal), a scientific journal dealing with intelligence and psychometrics
 Intelligence (newspaper), an Australian newspaper

Television
 Intelligence (Canadian TV series), 2006–2007
 Intelligence (American TV series), 2014
 Intelligence (British TV series), 2020

Other uses
 Intelligence (solitaire), a card game

See also

 Artificial intelligence (disambiguation)
 Emotional intelligence
 Espionage, intelligence gathering
 Intellect (disambiguation)
 Intelligence analysis
 Inttelligent, a 2018 Indian Telugu-language film
 Nous, sometimes equated to intellect or intelligence
 Signals intelligence
 Social intelligence
 Theory of multiple intelligences